Ramon Pacheco Pardo is Professor of International Relations at King's College London and the KF-VUB Korea Chair at Vrije Universiteit Brussel.

Education and career

Pacheco Pardo received his PhD in International Relations from LSE. He teaches at King's College London and became KF-VUB Korea Chair in October 2017. He was editor of Millennium: Journal of International Studies in 2009–10. Pacheco Pardo has testified on North Korea before the European Parliament. In 2021 he was appointed Adjunct Fellow at CSIS.

Publications

Pacheco Pardo has written peer-reviewed articles, chapters and op-eds on North Korea's foreign relations and domestic affairs, South Korea's domestic affairs, inter-Korean relations and EU-Asia relations. Pacheco Pardo is the author of "North Korea-US Relations Under Kim Jong Il: The Quest for Normalization?", where he argues that North Korea's main foreign policy goal is to normalize diplomatic relations with the United States to boost its security and launch economic reform. It hast been among the top-selling North Korea books in South Korea. He has advocated engagement with North Korea to improve the situation in the Korean Peninsula.

He is the author of "Shrimp to Whale: South Korea from the Forgotten War to K-Pop", a history of South Korea since its foundation in 1948 to the 2022 presidential election. The book analyses the political, economic, social and cultural evolution of the country over the decades. The book was reviewed in Chosun Ilbo, Financial Times, The Korea Herald and The New Statesman.

References 

Year of birth missing (living people)
Living people
Academics of King's College London
Alumni of the London School of Economics
Experts on North Korea
Place of birth missing (living people)